Melodi Grand Prix Nordic 2009 was the fifth and final MGP Nordic, a Scandinavian song contest for children aged 8 to 15. The contest was held on November 28, 2009 in Stockholm, Sweden, with Norway, Denmark, Finland and Sweden participating. Each country submitted two songs to participate in the first round with the top placing entry from each country proceeding to the super-final. The winner of MGP Nordic 2009 was host country Sweden's Ulrik Munther with "En vanlig dag".

National selections
 Norway decided: 5 September 2009
 Denmark decided: 26 September 2009
 Sweden decided: 2 October 2009
 Finland decided: 9 October 2009

Participants

Denmark
 Pelle Blarke, better known as PelleB, wrote "Kun min" alongside Mathilde Christensen, whom not much is known about. "Kun min" features guest vocals from then 14-year-old Freya Bertel.
 Engledrys is the moniker of then 8-year-old Emma Askling, along with two backup singers. "Familien, min bedste ven" was written by Emma herself.

Finland
 Amanda Sjöholm was born on New Year's Day 1997. "Jag vill leva" is self-written and is about how she wants to live a free life.
 Not much is known about The Black White Boys or their song "Kommer du ihåg mig?".

Norway

Sweden

Final
Each of the Scandinavian countries are represented by two artists. The artist with the most votes from each country proceeds to the Super Final.

The four artists with the most votes were Amanda from Finland, PelleB from Denmark, Jørgen from Norway and Ulrik from Sweden.

Super-final 
Each super finalist sang their songs again for the Scandinavian public. The viewers then voted for the second time whilst the second interval act took place, which was MGP Nordic 2008 winners The BlackSheeps. Sweden was the winner with 36 points, getting 12 points from the other three countries. Denmark was second, while Norway and Finland each got 20 points, thus being in the bottom two. Ulrik sang "En vanlig dag" once more while the credits rolled.

Voting

References 

MGP Nordic
2009 in Swedish music
2009 in Finnish television
2009 in Danish music
2009 in Norwegian music
2009 in Swedish television
2009 song contests
2009 in Danish television
2009 in Norwegian television
2009 in Finnish music